Philip Ian Mounstephen (born 13 July 1959) is a British Anglican bishop and missionary; he has been the Bishop of Truro since November 2018. From 2012 to 2018, he was the executive leader of the Church Mission Society (CMS); he previously worked for Church Pastoral Aid Society (CPAS) and has served in parish ministry in the Diocese of Oxford, the Diocese of Southwark, and in the Diocese in Europe.

Early life and education
Mounstephen was born on 13 July 1959 in Crookham Village, Hampshire, England. He was educated at St Edward's School, Oxford, a private boarding school in Oxford, Oxfordshire. He studied English literature at the University of Southampton, graduating with a Bachelor of Arts (BA) degree in 1980. He then underwent teacher training at Magdalen College, Oxford, completing his Postgraduate Certificate in Education (PGCE) in 1981.

In 1985, Mounstephen entered Wycliffe Hall, Oxford, an Evangelical Anglican theological college, to train for ordained ministry. During this time, he also studied theology at Magdalen College, Oxford, and he graduated with a further BA in 1987: as per tradition, his BA was later promoted to a Master of Arts (MA Oxon) degree. He also completed a Certificate in Theology (CTh) in 1988.

Ordained ministry
Mounstephen was ordained in the Church of England: made a deacon at Petertide 1988 (3 July) at St Mary's Church, Amersham and ordained a priest the following Petertide (2 July 1989) at Christ Church Cathedral, Oxford — both times by Simon Burrows, Bishop of Buckingham. From 1988 to 1992, he served his curacy at St James Church, Gerrards Cross with St James' Church, Fulmer in the Diocese of Oxford. From 1992 to 1998, he was Vicar of St James Church, West Streatham in the Diocese of Southwark.

In 1998, Mounstephen joined the Church Pastoral Aid Society (CPAS) and served in a number of roles. He was head of Pathfinders from 1998 to 2002; director of the CY Network from 2001 to 2002; head of ministry from 2002 to 2007; and deputy general director from 2004 to 2007.

In January 2007, Mounstephen returned to parish ministry as chaplain (the senior minister) of St Michael's Church, Paris. During his time in Paris, he also served as a member of the diocesan synod of the Diocese in Europe. He was a made a minor canon of the Cathedral of the Holy Trinity, Gibraltar, in August 2012, and he was collated as a "canon without stall" during a service at St Matthew's Church, Westminster, in October 2017.

On 1 July 2012, it was announced that Mounstephen would be the next executive leader of the Church Mission Society (CMS) in succession to Tim Dakin. He took up the post on 13 October 2012 during a commissioning service at St Aldate's Church, Oxford.

On 30 August 2018, it was announced that Mounstephen would be the next Bishop of Truro, the diocesan bishop of the Diocese of Truro. He officially became bishop upon the confirmation — on 20 November 2018 at St-Mary-le-Bow — of his election; he was consecrated a bishop on 30 November at St Paul's Cathedral by Justin Welby, Archbishop of Canterbury, and was welcomed at Truro Cathedral on 12 January 2019.

Personal life
In 1984, Mounstephen married Ruth Weston. Together they have one daughter.

Selected works

References

1959 births
Living people
British Anglican missionaries
20th-century English Anglican priests
21st-century Church of England bishops
People from Hampshire (before 1974)
Alumni of the University of Southampton
Alumni of Magdalen College, Oxford
Alumni of Wycliffe Hall, Oxford
Diocese in Europe clergy
Bishops of Truro